Good Throb was a feminist punk band from London that was active between 2010 and 2016. They consisted of  KY Ellie (Ellie Roberts) on vocals, BB Thing (Bryony Beynon) on guitar, Ash Tray (Ashleigh Holland) on bass and L-Hard (Louis Harding) on drums. The band formed after having all met through the London punk scene.

They started with the intention of everyone taking part doing something new to them, whether that was playing an instrument or being the vocalist.  Beynon and Harding had previously played together in a band called The Sceptres where Beynon was vocalist and Harding was on bass. Holland later sang in the band Frau.

They released three 7-inch EPs and one full-length LP. Music journalist Jenn Pelly described them as "raw, primal, ferocious, pissed, crude" and "a manic London post-punk band that hinges between razorsharp cleverness and total disintegration".

Discography

Albums
 Fuck Off - SuperFi Records (UK) / White Denim / Sabermetric (USA) 12-inch LP, MP3 (2014)

EPs
 S/T - SuperFi Records (UK) 7-inch EP, MP3 (2012) / Play Pinball (USA) 7-inch EP, MP3 (2013)
 Culture Vulture - Muscle Horse (UK) / Accidental Guest (USA) 7-inch EP, MP3 (2013)
 S/T - La Vida Es Un Mus (UK) 7-inch EP, MP3 (2016)

Compilations
 9 Modern Classics - Cool Marriage Records (EU) Cassette (2016)

References

Musical groups from London
Underground punk scene in the United Kingdom
Musical groups established in 2010
Musical groups disestablished in 2016
English punk rock groups
2010 establishments in England